Sticky everlasting is a common name for several plants native to Australia and may refer to:

Ozothamnus thyrsoideus
Xerochrysum viscosum